François Désbonnet (29 September 1920 – 7 February 2003) was a French water polo player. He competed in the men's tournament at the 1948 Summer Olympics.

See also
 France men's Olympic water polo team records and statistics
 List of men's Olympic water polo tournament goalkeepers

References

External links
 

1920 births
2003 deaths
French male water polo players
Water polo goalkeepers
Olympic water polo players of France
Water polo players at the 1948 Summer Olympics
Place of birth missing